Mecklenburgisch-Vorpommersch is a Low German dialect spoken in the German state of Mecklenburg-Vorpommern. It belongs to the East Low German group.

In the western parts of the language area it is similar to some West Low German dialects, while the eastern parts are influenced by the Central Pomeranian (Mittelpommersch) dialect. It differs slightly from East Pomeranian, which used to be spoken widely in the what in 1945 became the Polish part of Farther Pomerania and included much more Slavic Pomeranian and Kashubian elements.

Geography
 In former Mecklenburg-Schwerin: Schwerin-Rostock-Wismar-Güstrow)
 In Western Pomerania: Stralsund-Greifswald-Anklam)
 In former Mecklenburg-Strelitz: Neustrelitz-Neubrandenburg

Grammar

Pronouns 
The personal pronouns in the dialect of Fritz Reuter are as follow:

The reflexive pronoun of the 3rd person is sick, and the possessive pronouns (which are declined like strong adjectives) are:

Numbers
Numbers in the dialect of Fritz Reuter are:

Verbs
Uncomposed forms in the dialect of Fritz Reuter:

 The e in parentheses often gets dropped.

References

Low German
German dialects
Languages of Germany
Pomerania
Culture of Mecklenburg-Western Pomerania